Mutter may refer to:

Arts and entertainment
 Mutter (album), a 2001 album by Rammstein
 "Mutter" (song), a song by Rammstein

Other uses
 Mutter (software), a window manager initially for X Window System, which became a Wayland compositor
 Mutter (surname)
 Mutters, a municipality near Innsbruck, Austria
 Mütter Museum, a medical museum in Philadelphia, Pennsylvania, US

See also
 Mutterstadt, a municipality in Germany